is a co-ed private junior college in Kobe, Hyōgo, Japan, established in 1967.

In 2008 the school corporation (Tamada Educational Institution) established Kobe Tokiwa University by reorganizing two departments (medical technology and nursing) of the college.

External links
 Official website 

Japanese junior colleges
Educational institutions established in 2005
Private universities and colleges in Japan
Universities and colleges in Hyōgo Prefecture
2005 establishments in Japan